(), a member of AEON, operates the Ministop convenience store franchise chain in Japan. Unlike most other convenience stores in Japan, Ministop stores feature a kitchen that prepares sandwiches, snacks and take out bento boxes on demand, and has a seating area where customers can sit down and eat immediately.

Products
The usual Japanese convenience store goods are available, such as magazines, manga comic books, soft drinks, contraceptives, onigiri ; services include bill payment, photocopying, ticket purchase for events and ATM access. Ministop also has its own unique brand of fast food. The menu varies according to season and periodical promotions. A typical selection might include hot dogs, sandwiches, frozen desserts such as their flagship soft serve ice cream, kariman and chūkaman—Siopao-style buns with various fillings.

International operations 
Ministop also operates in China, Vietnam and Kazakhstan.

Former operations

South Korea 
The first Ministop store in South Korea opened in November 1990 in Mok-dong, as a joint-venture with Daesang Corporation; Ministop bought Daesang's stake in the venture in 2003. As of October 2017, there were 2418 operating Ministop stores.

In January 2022, Lotte Corporation acquired the entire stake of Ministop Korea Co. for 313.37 billion won ($263 million).

Philippines 

In December of 2000, the Japan-based convenience store chain Ministop made its way to the Philippines, being brought to the country by Robinsons Retail Holdings, Inc. in partnership with Ministop Japan and Mitsubishi Corporation. In January 2022, Robinsons Group assumed full ownership of the Ministop business in the Philippines with 460 branches. It was announced that the stores would be rebranded as Uncle John's, after the flagship fried chicken product sold in the Philippine market since 2006.

References

External links
 
  
 Ministop Philippines (Robinsons Convenience Stores, Inc.)

Aeon Group
Companies based in Chiba Prefecture
Companies listed on the Tokyo Stock Exchange
Convenience stores of Japan
Convenience stores of the Philippines
Japanese brands
Retail companies of Japan
Retail companies established in 1980